Crescent is an unincorporated community in Belmont County, in the U.S. state of Ohio.

History
A post office called Crescent was established in 1895, and remained in operation until 1919. Crescent was originally a mining community.

References

Unincorporated communities in Belmont County, Ohio
1895 establishments in Ohio
Unincorporated communities in Ohio